NCRV (Nederlandse Christelijke Radio Vereniging) (English: Dutch Christian Radio Association) was a public radio and television broadcaster in the Netherlands, mostly transmitting on NPO 1 and NPO 2.

On 1 January 2014, NCRV merged with KRO to form KRO-NCRV.

Notable people
Mariska Hulscher, presenter

Programmes
 Help, 1990s drama
 Hello Goodbye, 2005 ongoing reality television
 Zonder Ernst, 1990s sitcom
 It's All in the Game, 1980s game show
 Disney Club, programming block

See also
Television networks in the Netherlands

References

External links

Official website

Dutch public broadcasting organisations
Netherlands Public Broadcasting
Dutch-language television networks
Christian television networks
Radio stations established in 1924
Television channels and stations established in 1959
Dutch companies established in 1924